Remote access policy is a document which outlines and defines acceptable methods of remotely connecting to the internal network.  It is essential in large organization where networks are geographically dispersed and extend into insecure network locations such as public networks or unmanaged home networks.  It should cover all available methods to remotely access internal resources:
 dial-in (SLIP, PPP)
 ISDN/Frame Relay
 telnet access from Internet
 Cable modem

This remote access policy defines standards for connecting to the organizational network and security standards for computers that are allowed to connect to the organizational network.

This remote access policy specifies how remote users can connect to the main organizational network and the requirements for each of their systems before they are allowed to connect.

See also
Network security policy
Computer security policy
User account policy
Internet security
Computer security
Network security
Industrial espionage
Information security

External links
 National Institute for Standards and Technology]

Information technology management